Merlo Road/Southwest 158th Avenue is a light rail station on the MAX Blue Line in Beaverton, Oregon, United States. It is the 10th stop westbound on the Westside MAX.

Located to the south of the station is Merlo Garage used by TriMet buses and a paved path into Tualatin Hills Nature Park. It is also the primary transit stop for students attending Merlo Station High School.  It is also a short walk to the Nike World campus, and the H.M. Terpenning Recreational center. In March 2011, TriMet received a federal grant to pay for the installation of security cameras at the station.

Bus connections
This station is served by the following bus line:
67 - Bethany/158th Avenue

Car connections
There is no parking area at this station.

References

External links
Station information (with westbound ID number) from TriMet
Station information (with eastbound ID number) from TriMet
MAX Light Rail Stations – more general TriMet page

MAX Light Rail stations
MAX Blue Line
1998 establishments in Oregon
Railway stations in the United States opened in 1998
Transportation in Beaverton, Oregon
Railway stations in Washington County, Oregon